Daughter of Silence (1961) is a crime novel by Australian author Morris West.

Plot outline
In mid-summer in a Tuscan village a twenty-four-year-old woman shoots the town's mayor dead in revenge for the death of her mother during the war.  The subsequent trial brings out secrets both personal and political.

Critical reception
Joyce Halstead in The Australian Women's Weekly was impressed with the work: "Excellent writing in an attractive novel which uses all the gimmicks for modern reader success - an Italian setting, a court scene with a beautiful young woman on trial for murder, and intricately woven love affairs...The whole resolves itself fairly expectedly and tritely - but the intellectual arguments, convincing dialogue, emotional undertones, and competently wrought plot make it a very satisfying story."  Was produced as a Broadway play in 1961. https://www.playbill.com/production/daughter-of-silence-music-box-theatre-vault-0000002628

See also
 1961 in Australian literature

Notes
 Dedication: For Hilda
 Epigraph: Alta vendetta d'alto silenzio e figlia/ Noble vengeance is the daughter of deep silence./ (Alfieri: La Congiura de' Pazzi, Act 1. Sc. 1.)

References

Australian crime novels
1961 Australian novels
Works by Morris West